Kubilay Aka (born 12 April 1995) is a Turkish actor.

Life and career 
Kubilay Aka was born in 1995. His maternal family is of Bosnian descent. He has a degree in Airport Management from Anadolu University. He later took acting lessons and worked at an airline in Muğla before making his television debut with Kanal D series Vatanım Sensin as Ali Kemal. He had another supporting role in the popular series Çukur, in which he portrayed the character of Celasun. He had a small role in the 2017 movie Arif V 216. He was cast in a leading role in the 2018 movie Aşk Bu Mu? alongside Afra Saraçoğlu. In 2020, he had one of the main roles in Netflix original series Aşk 101, playing the role of Kerem.

Personal life
In September 2020, Aka tested positive for COVID-19, along with his castmates Alina Boz and İpek Filiz Yazıcı, who also tested positive for the virus.

Filmography

Television

Film

Web series

References

External links 
 
 
 

1995 births
Turkish male film actors
Turkish male television actors
Male actors from Istanbul
Living people
Anadolu University alumni